The 89th edition of the Tour of Flanders cycling classic saw the emergence of Tom Boonen in the Flemish classics.

Race overview 
This edition was run under clear skies and good weather. Even past the feared Muur van Geraardsbergen there were still a handful of riders in the front group: favorites Tom Boonen (Quick Step-Innergetic) and Peter Van Petegem (Davitamon-Lotto), Erik Zabel and Andreas Klier (T-Mobile), Roberto Petito (Fassa Bortolo), and Alessandro Ballan (Lampre). Klier set the tempo to keep the group together for a final sprint, hoping for Zabel to win.

Given Boonen's reputation as a sprinter, he surprised his adversaries by launching a solo attack in the run-in to the finish to counter van Petegem's attack, after the Bosberg climb. Despite being chased by the two T-Mobile riders, he managed to take a solo win to Meerbeke.

General standings
3 April 2005, Brugge-Meerbeke, 256 km.

References

External links
Race website

Tour of Flanders
Tour of Flanders
2005